Choi Yoon-young (born September 25, 1986) is a South Korean actress. She has notable roles in Seoyoung, My Daughter, Passionate Love, My Dear Cat and Designated Survivor: 60 Days among other works.

Career
After passing the 21st KBS actors' auditions in 2008, Choi began playing supporting roles in television series, notably in Bread, Love and Dreams (2010) and Seoyoung, My Daughter (2012). She then appeared twice on the big screen in 2012: in the short film "Endless Flight" in omnibus Horror Stories, and the table tennis sports film As One.

In 2013, Choi played her first leading role in the four-episode romantic comedy series Like a Fairytale, followed by The Greatest Thing in the World (a Chuseok special on single mothers and adoptees) and the melodrama Passionate Love.

In recent years, Choi became known among Korean telenovela audiences, having acted as the protagonist in several titles of the genre such as Enemies From the Past, All is Well, My Dear Cat.

Choi made a comeback to weekly miniseries in 2019 with tvN's political thriller Designated Survivor: 60 Days, based on the American television series of the same title, in which she played the counterpart of Italia Ricci's role.

In August 2021, Choi signed with new agency IOK Company.

Filmography

Film

Television series

Television shows

Theater

Awards and nominations

References

External links
 
 

1986 births
Living people
21st-century South Korean actresses
Actresses from Seoul
South Korean television actresses
South Korean film actresses
South Korean stage actresses
Dankook University alumni